The Los Angeles Scottish Pipe Band, or, more commonly, the LA Scots, is a pipe band located in Orange County, California.  The LA Scots have competed at the grade one level since 1998.  In February 2018, the Western United States Pipe Band Association granted a request by the LA Scots to move to Grade 2.

During their time in Grade 1, the band placed ninth in the qualification round at the 2008 World Pipe Band Championships, and placed 14th in the qualification round of 2009.  In 2007, the band qualified for the Grade 1 competition and placed 11th.

Pipe Majors 
 Scott Ruscoe (1990–1992)
 Scott MacDonald (1992–2004)
 Colin Armstrong ( 2004–2019)
 Scott MacDonald (2019–present)

Leading Drummers 
 Tom Foley (1991)
 Joseph Foley (1991–1995)
 Duncan Millar (1996–1997)
 Carl Lenny (1998–2000, 2002–2003, 2017-2022)
 Andrew Hoinacki (2004–2005)
 Andrew Brubaker (2001, 2006)
 Richard Baughman (2006–2010)
 Glenn Kvidahl (2010–2014)
 Bryce Parker (2015)
 Molly Steuber (2016)

Discography 
 At the Beach (1999)

References

External links 
 Official Site
  Discussion Group

Grade 2 pipe bands
Musical groups established in 1990